Jeshua ben Judah was a Karaite scholar, exegete and philosopher, who lived in eleventh-century Iraq (or Persia, according to some sources) or at Jerusalem.

He was pupil of Joseph ben Abraham ha-Ro'eh. Jeshua was considered one of the highest authorities among the Karaites, by whom he is called "the great teacher" ("al-mu'allim"). 

Like all the Karaite leaders, he was a very active propagandist; and his public lectures on Karaism attracted many inquirers. Among these was a Castilian Rabbinite named Sidi ibn Ibrahim al-Taras, who, after having accepted the Karaite teachings, returned to his native country, where he organized a powerful propaganda by circulating Jeshua's writings. The greatest service, however, rendered by Jeshua to Karaism was his accomplishment of the reform of the laws concerning incest, a reform which had been advocated by his teacher.

As Biblical exegete

Jeshua's activity in the domain of Bible exegesis was very extensive. He translated the Pentateuch into Arabic, and wrote thereon an exhaustive commentary, of which he made, in 1054, an abridged version. In this commentary, Jeshua made use of all the exegetical works of his Karaite predecessors and of that of Saadia Gaon, often attacking the latter most vigorously. Several passages of Jeshua's commentary are quoted by Abraham ibn Ezra. Fragments of the Pentateuch translation and of the exhaustive commentary on a part of Leviticus, with almost the whole of the abridged version, are extant in manuscript in the British Museum (MSS. Or. 2491; 2494, ii; 2544-46). Both commentaries were early translated into Hebrew; and parts of them are in the Firkovich collection at St. Petersburg. Jeshua wrote two other Biblical works, an Arabic commentary on the Decalogue (which he reproduced in an abridged form); and a philosophical midrash entitled "Bereshit Rabbah," in which he discusses, in the spirit of the Mutazilite "kalam," creation, the existence and unity of God, the divine attributes, etc. A fragment of a Hebrew translation of the abridged commentary on the Decalogue, made by Tobiah ben Moses under the title "Pitron 'Aseret ha-Debarim," is still extant in manuscript ("Cat. Leyden," Nos. 5 and 41, 2). The "Bereshit Rabbah" is no longer in existence; but passages from it are frequently quoted by Aaron of Nicomedia in his "'Etz Hayyim," and by Abraham ibn Daud, who in his "Sefer ha-Qabbalah" (end) calls it a blasphemous work.

Rules of Relationship

Jeshua was also the author of a work on the precepts, entitled "Sefer ha-Yashar," which has not been preserved. From it was probably extracted his treatise on the degrees of relationship within which marriage is forbidden, quoted by him under the title "Al-Jawabat wal-Masa'il fi al-'Arayot," and known in the Hebrew translation made by Jacob ben Simon under the title "Sefer ha-'Arayot." Fragments of both the Arabic text and the Hebrew translation still exist in manuscript, the former in the British Museum (H. Or. No. 2497, iii.), and the latter in the libraries of Leyden ("Cat. Leyden," Nos. 25, 1; 41, 16) and St. Petersburg (MS. No. 1614). In this treatise Jeshua discusses the hermeneutic rules which are to be used in the interpretation of these laws, gives a critical view of the principles upon which the various prohibitions are based, quotes Karaite authorities, such as Anan ben David and al-Qirqisani, on the subject, and produces the views of the Rabbinites Saadia and Simon Kahira (author of the "Halakot Gedolot"). Another treatise by Jeshua on the same subject was the "Teshubat ha-'Iḳḳar," published at Eupatoria in 1834 under the title "Iggeret ha-Teshubah."

Jeshua was also the author of the following philosophical treatises, probably translated from the Arabic: "Marpe la-'Etzem," in twenty-five short chapters, containing proofs of the creation of the world, of the existence of God, and of His unity, omniscience, and providence (MS. Paris No. 670; MS. St. Petersburg No. 686); "Meshibot Nefesh," on revelation, prophecy, and the veracity of the Law; and three supplementary chapters to Joseph ben Abraham ha-Ro'eh's "Sefer Ne'imot" ("Cat. Leyden," No. 172), in which Jeshua treats of reward and punishment and of penitence. The Arabic original manuscript of the last of these three chapters is in the British Museum. It bears the title "Mas'alah Mufarridah," and the author shows therein that the repetition of a prohibition must necessarily have a bearing on the punishment in case of transgression.

Notes

Resources
  It contains the following bibliography: 
Pinsker, Liḳḳuṭe Ḳadmoniyyot, p. 71 and Index;
Fürst, Gesch. des Karäert. ii. 162 et seq.;
Gottlober, Biḳkoret le-Toledot ha-Ḳera'im, p. 195;
G. Margoliouth, in J. Q. R. xi. 187 et seq.;
Steinschneider, Hebr. Uebers. pp. 459, 942;
idem, Die Arabische Literatur der Juden, § 51;
Schreiner, in Bericht der Lehranstalt, 1900;
Neubauer, Aus der Petersburger Bibliothek, pp. 19 et seq.

Karaite rabbis
11th-century rabbis from the Seljuk Empire